Israel–Uruguay relations are foreign relations between Israel and Uruguay. Uruguay was the first South American country to recognize Israel.

History

On 29 November 1947, Uruguay voted in favor for the Partition of Palestine which led to the creation of the State of Israel. In May 1948, Uruguay recognized the State of Israel and established diplomatic relations. In 1948, future Israeli President Yitzhak Navon headed a diplomatic delegation to Uruguay.

In May 1986, Uruguayan President Julio Maria Sanguinetti paid an official visit to Israel, becoming the first Uruguayan head of state to do so. During his visit to Israel, both nations signed agreements in the fields of social security, investments and medical and veterinary care. In August 2008, Uruguayan President Tabaré Vázquez paid an official visit to Israel. During his visit to the country, both nations signed an agreement to promote industrial research and development. In 2010, Israel signed a Free Trade Agreement with Mercosur (which includes Uruguay).

In 2016, the Israeli embassy in Montevideo transferred supplies to aid flood victims in Uruguay, where more than 13,000 people were displaced.

Uruguay maintained an embassy in Jerusalem from 1954 to 1980.

On 29 September 2020, Uruguay fired one of its top diplomats after UN Watch exposed the country’s vote for a UN resolution that singled out Israel alone in the world for supposedly violating women’s rights. Uruguay’s Foreign Minister Francisco Bustillo declared that his country’s UN vote against Israel was a “circumstantial error,” and removed the foreign ministry’s director-general of political affairs, Ambassador Pablo Sader, and that Uruguay’s “foreign policy will keep its historical stance to defend the rights of Israel.”

Resident diplomatic missions
 Israel has an embassy in Montevideo.
 Uruguay has an embassy in Tel Aviv.

See also 
 Foreign relations of Israel 
 Foreign relations of Uruguay
 History of the Jews in Uruguay
 Uruguayan Jews in Israel

References

 

 
Bilateral relations of Uruguay
Uruguay